Karolinów may refer to the following places:
Karolinów, Piotrków County in Łódź Voivodeship (central Poland)
Karolinów, Gmina Tomaszów Mazowiecki in Łódź Voivodeship (central Poland)
Karolinów, Lublin Voivodeship (east Poland)
Karolinów, Gmina Żelechlinek in Łódź Voivodeship (central Poland)
Karolinów, Świętokrzyskie Voivodeship (south-central Poland)
Karolinów, Garwolin County in Masovian Voivodeship (east-central Poland)
Karolinów, Wyszków County in Masovian Voivodeship (east-central Poland)